The American Language; An Inquiry into the Development of English in the United States, first published in 1919, is H. L. Mencken's book about the English language as spoken in the United States.

Origins and concept
Mencken was inspired by "the argot of the colored waiters" in Washington, as well as one of his favorite authors, Mark Twain, and his experiences on the streets of Baltimore. In 1902, Mencken remarked on the "queer words which go into the making of 'United States.'" The book was preceded by several columns in The Evening Sun. Mencken eventually asked "Why doesn't some painstaking pundit attempt a grammar of the American language... English, that is, as spoken by the great masses of the plain people of this fair land?"

In the tradition of Noah Webster, who wrote the first American dictionary, Mencken wanted to defend "Americanisms" against a steady stream of English critics, who usually isolated Americanisms as borderline "perversions" of the "mother tongue". Mencken assaulted the prescriptive grammar of these critics and American "schoolmarms",  arguing, like Samuel Johnson in the preface to his dictionary, that language evolves independently of textbooks.

The book discusses the beginnings of "American" variations from "English", the spread of these variations, American names and slang over the course of its 374 pages. According to Mencken, American English was more colourful, vivid, and creative than its British counterpart.

The book sold exceptionally well by Mencken's standards—1400 copies in the first two months. The book was an early title published by Alfred A. Knopf and was revised three times in the author's lifetime. Reviews of the book praised it lavishly, with the exception of one by Mencken's old nemeses, Stuart Sherman.

Many of the sources and research material associated with the book are in the Mencken collection at the Enoch Pratt Free Library in Baltimore, Maryland.

Editions
The first edition of 1919 was revised in 1921 and 1923; the fourth "corrected, revised, and enlarged" edition was published in 1936. Mencken released two full-sized Supplements to the main volume, in 1945 and 1948, based on the boom in linguistics articles. An abridged single-volume compilation of the original volume and supplements was edited by Raven I. McDavid Jr. and published in 1963.

Audiobooks 
An audiobook version was released in 2021 by Spoken Realms, read by Rebecca H. Lee

Sources
Hobson, Fred. Mencken. Random House, New York, 1994.

References

External links
Ebook: (The American Language: A Preliminary Inquiry into the Development of English in the United States [Illustrated edition])

2021Audiobook: (The American Language: An Inquiry into the Development of English in the United States)

1919 non-fiction books
Alfred A. Knopf books
American English
American culture
Books by H. L. Mencken
Linguistics books